NURP.38.BPC.6 was a pigeon who received the Dickin Medal in 1946 from the People's Dispensary for Sick Animals for bravery in service during the Second World War.

See also
 List of individual birds

References

External links
 PDSA Dickin Medal

Recipients of the Dickin Medal
Individual domesticated pigeons